John F. "Doc" Haggerty  (1895–1964) was a professional football player who spent two years of the American Professional Football Association (the forerunner to the National Football League) with the Cleveland Tigers, Canton Bulldogs, and the New York Brickley Giants. Doc played college football at Tufts University.

Notes

1894 births
1964 deaths
Players of American football from Ohio
Canton Bulldogs players
Cleveland Tigers (NFL) players
New York Brickley Giants players
Tufts University alumni
Tufts Jumbos football players